Bocce competitions at the 2022 South American Games in Asunción, Paraguay were held between October 12 and 14, 2022 at the Bochódromo.

Schedule
The competition schedule is as follows:

Medal summary

Medal table

Medalists

Participation
Six nations participated in bocce of the 2022 South American Games.

References

Bocce
South American Games
2022